Muschampia lavatherae, the marbled skipper, is a butterfly of the family Hesperiidae. It is found from the Rhine Rift Valley in central Germany up to North Africa and from south-eastern France up to Anatolia.

The wingspan is 28–34 mm. The butterfly gives one generation per year and flies from May to July depending on the location.

The larvae feed on Stachys recta and Sideritis scordioides in Southern Europe.

This species was formerly a member of the genus Carcharodus. As a result of genomic research published in 2020, it was transferred to the genus Muschampia.

References

External links 
 Butterflies of Europe
 Butterfly Conservation Armenia

Carcharodus
Butterflies described in 1783
Butterflies of Europe